Dolgellau railway station in Gwynedd, North Wales, was a station on the Ruabon to Barmouth line, originally the terminus of a Cambrian Railways branch from Barmouth Junction, then linked by the Great Western Railway to Bala and Ruabon. The station spent most of its life with the spelling "Dolgelley" (often pronounced, especially in English, as ); this was altered to "Dolgellau" on 12 September 1960. It was opened on 4 August 1868, and closed to passengers on Monday 18 January 1965 as a result of the Beeching Axe.

It had two platforms and a passing loop, an extensive goods yard and turntable. According to the Official Handbook of Stations the following classes of traffic were being handled at this station in 1956: G, P, F, L, H & C and there was a 6-ton crane.

No trace remains of the station, which was demolished in the late 1970s to make way for the A470 Dolgellau bypass.

Neighbouring stations

References

Further reading

External links
 Photos of Dolgellau Station from Dolgellau.net
 Dolgellau Railway Station Records on Archives Wales
 Dolgellau station on navigable 1946 O. S. map

Disused railway stations in Gwynedd
Beeching closures in Wales
Dolgellau
Former Great Western Railway stations
Railway stations in Great Britain opened in 1868
Railway stations in Great Britain closed in 1965